Yadollah "Shiravan" Mohebbi (born 9 December 1993) is an Iranian freestyle wrestler. He is a three-time gold medalist at the Asian Wrestling Championships in the men's 125 kg event, in 2017, 2019 and 2022.

Career 

He won the gold medal in the men's 125kg at the 2017 Asian Wrestling Championships held in New Delhi, India. He competed in the men's 125kg event at the 2017 World Wrestling Championships held in Paris, France. He won one of the bronze medals in the his event at the 2017 Asian Indoor and Martial Arts Games held in Ashgabat, Turkmenistan.

In 2019, he competed in the men's 125kg event at the World Wrestling Championships held in Nur-Sultan, Kazakhstan without winning a medal. He won his first match against Dorjkhandyn Khüderbulga of Mongolia and also his next match against Nick Gwiazdowski of the United States but he was then eliminated from the competition by Oleksandr Khotsianivskyi of Ukraine. Later that year, he represented Iran at the 2019 Military World Games held in Wuhan, China and he won the silver medal in the men's 125 kg event. In the final, he lost against Taha Akgül of Turkey.

He won the gold medal in his event at the 2022 Asian Wrestling Championships held in Ulaanbaatar, Mongolia.

Personal life 

He is a nephew of accomplished wrestlers Mohammad Hassan and Mohammad Hossein Mohebbi.

Achievements

References

External links 
 

Living people
1993 births
Sportspeople from Kermanshah
Iranian male sport wrestlers
Asian Wrestling Championships medalists
21st-century Iranian people